Ice hockey at the 2019 Winter Universiade was held from 1 to 12 March at the Crystal Ice Arena (men's tournament) and from 1 to 11 March at the Pervomaisky Ice Arena and Arena Sever (women's tournament) in Krasnoyarsk.

Venues

Men's tournament

Preliminary round

Group A 

All times are local (UTC+7).

Group B

Playoff round

Bracket

Semifinals

Bronze medal game

Gold medal game

Final standings

Source: Krasnoyarsk 2019

Scoring leaders
List shows the top skaters sorted by points, then goals.

GP = Games played; G = Goals; A = Assists; Pts = Points; +/− = Plus-minus; PIM = Penalties In MinutesSource: Krasnoyarsk 2019

Women's tournament

Preliminary round

Playoff round

Bracket

Semifinals

Bronze medal game

Gold medal game

Final standings

Source: Krasnoyarsk 2019

Scoring leaders
List shows the top skaters sorted by points, then goals.

GP = Games played; G = Goals; A = Assists; Pts = Points; +/− = Plus-minus; PIM = Penalties In MinutesSource: Krasnoyarsk 2019

References

External links
Results 
Results Book – Ice Hockey – Men
Results Book – Ice Hockey – Women

Ice Hockey
2019
2019
Universiade